The blue-chinned sapphire or blue-chinned emerald (Chlorestes notata) is a hummingbird that ranges from Colombia south and east to the Guianas, Trinidad and Tobago, Peru, and Brazil. There have been occasional records from Tobago. For Brazil, the species' range is along the main Amazon River Basin, as well as the Atlantic Forest, both in the northeast, as well as far south on the southeast coastal strip, (an entire coastal strip, north-east-south of about 3000 km). It is sometimes placed in the genus Chlorostilbon.

It is a bird of forests and sometimes cultivated areas with large trees. The female lays her eggs in a deep cup nest, made of lichen and other fine plant material and placed on a horizontal tree branch.  Incubation is 16 days with a further 18–19 days to fledging.

Blue-chinned sapphires feed on insects and nectar, mainly in trees but sometimes on vines, shrubs, herbs, epiphytes or smaller plants like Heliconia. The song is a high metallic .

Description 
The blue-chinned sapphire is 8.9 cm long and weighs 3.8 g. The bill is fairly straight, with the upper mandible black and the lower reddish. The male has mainly green plumage, darker above, with white thighs, a forked metallic blue tail and blue upper throat. The female differs from the male in that she has green-spotted white underparts.

References

External links
 Blue-chinned sapphire photo gallery VIREO

Chlorestes
Birds of Venezuela
Birds of the Ecuadorian Amazon
Birds of the Peruvian Amazon
Birds of the Guianas
Birds of the Amazon Basin
Birds of Trinidad and Tobago
Birds of the Atlantic Forest
Hummingbird species of South America
blue-chinned sapphire
blue-chinned sapphire
Birds of Brazil
Taxobox binomials not recognized by IUCN